Leaonna Laneah Odom (born March 26, 1998) is an American professional basketball player who is currently a free agent in the Women's National Basketball Association (WNBA). She played college basketball for the Duke Blue Devils.

High school career
Odom started her high school basketball career at Los Alamitos High School where she averaged 14.3 points and 8.8 rebounds in her freshman season. She moved to Mater Dei for her sophomore season. She played the remainder of her high school basketball career at Chaminade College Prep where she averaged 21.5 points, 9.9 rebounds, 2.5 assists, 1.5 steals and 2.1 blocks in her senior year. She participated in the 2016 McDonald's All-American game in Chicago and the 2016 Jordan Brand Classic in New York where she scored 13 points, 3 rebounds and 2 blocks.

College career
Odom played college basketball for the Duke Blue Devils from 2016 to 2020. In her freshman season, she averaged  8.1 points, 4.6 rebounds and 0.7 assists per game. In her Sophomore season, she averaged  9.6 points, 6.3 rebounds and 1.7 assists per game. In her junior year, she averaged  13.1 points, 6.4 rebounds and 2.5 assists per game. In her senior year, she averaged 14.3 points, 6.2 rebounds and 1.3 assists per game. Her 54.7-percent shooting from the floor ranked fourth in the Atlantic Coast Conference.

Duke statistics
Source

Professional career
On April 17, 2020, the New York Liberty selected Odom as the 15th pick in the 2020 WNBA Draft.

WNBA career statistics

Regular season

|-
| style="text-align:left;"| 2020
| style="text-align:left;"| New York
| 22 || 16 || 20.6 || .490 || .250 || .870 || 2.3 || 0.7 || 0.7 || 0.4' || 0.7 || 5.5
|-
| style="text-align:left;"| 2021
| style="text-align:left;"| New York
| 18|| 0 || 12.1 || .467 || .294 || .750 || 1.2 || 0.4 || 0.3 || 0.3 || 0.6 || 3.1
|-
| style='text-align:left;'|Career
| style='text-align:left;'|2 years, 1 team
| 40 || 16 || 16.8 || .483 || .270 || .829 || 1.8 || 0.6 || 0.5 || 0.3 || 0.6 || 4.4

References

External links
Duke Blue Devils bio

1998 births
Living people
American women's basketball players
Basketball players from California
Duke Blue Devils women's basketball players
McDonald's High School All-Americans
New York Liberty draft picks
New York Liberty players
People from Lompoc, California
Small forwards